This page documents all tornadoes confirmed by various weather forecast offices of the National Weather Service in the United States from July to September 2021. Tornado counts are considered preliminary until final publication in the database of the National Centers for Environmental Information. On average, there are 134 confirmed tornadoes in the United States in July, 83 in August, and 74 in September.

All three months had varying levels of tornadoes that were produced from tropical cyclones. July was near average with 129 tornadoes, with several tornadoes produced by Hurricane Elsa as well as a destructive outbreak at the end of the month. August had 149 tornadoes, the first month to be above average since March. Most of the tornado activity came from the tropics, including moderate to severe outbreaks produced by Tropical Storm Fred and Hurricane Ida, the latter of which continued into September. The rest of September, however, saw only isolated tornado activity and was significantly below average with only 28 tornadoes.

United States yearly total

July

July 1 event

July 2 event

July 3 event

July 6 event

July 7 event
Event in the Southeastern United States was associated with Hurricane Elsa.

July 8 event
Event in the Southeastern United States was associated with Hurricane Elsa.

July 9 event
Event in the Eastern United States was associated with Hurricane Elsa.

July 10 event

July 11 event

July 12 event

July 13 event

July 14 event

July 15 event

July 17 event

July 18 event

July 20 event

July 23 event

July 24 event

July 26 event

July 28 event

July 29 event

July 31 event

August

August 1 event

August 2 event

August 7 event

August 8 event

August 9 event

August 10 event

August 11 event

August 12 event

August 13 event

August 17 event
Events were associated with Tropical Storm Fred.

August 18 event
Event was associated with Tropical Storm Fred.

August 19 event
Events in the Northeast were associated with Tropical Storm Fred.

August 20 event

August 21 event

August 22 event

August 23 event
Event was associated with Hurricane Henri.

August 25 event

August 27 event

August 28 event

August 29 event
Events in Mississippi and Louisiana were associated with Hurricane Ida.

August 30 event

August 31 event

September

September 1 event

September 2 event
Event in Massachusetts was associated with Hurricane Ida.

September 7 event

September 8 event
Event in Florida was associated with Tropical Storm Mindy.

September 9 event

September 13 event

September 17 event

September 18 event

September 20 event

September 22 event

September 27 event

See also
 Tornadoes of 2021
 List of United States tornadoes from April to June 2021
 List of United States tornadoes from October to November 2021

Notes

References

2021-related lists
Tornadoes of 2021
Tornadoes
2021, 4
2021 natural disasters in the United States
Tornadoes in the United States